A collegium is a French form of schooling that is both a secondary school and a college.

Information
They are uncommon today. Most collegiums in the United States were built by Roman Catholic religious institutes. One example is the College of the Immaculate Conception in New Orleans, established by the Society of Jesus (Jesuits) in 1847.

References

School types